Penh, commonly referred to as Daun Penh (meaning "Grandmother Penh" or "Old Lady Penh") or Lady Penh, was a wealthy woman who is credited as having founded Phnom Penh, the capital of Cambodia, in 1372 AD.

Legacy
Her statue can be seen near Wat Phnom.

References

14th-century Buddhists
Cambodian Buddhists
Cambodian women